Henry Troemner (1809–1873) was a German-American entrepreneur. He started the Henry Troemner Company, known today as Troemner Inc. The company produced balances and scales.

Troemner immigrated to the United States in 1832 and settled initially in New York City, then, by 1843, Philadelphia. He began making scales and weights in a partnership in 1840, and then established his own company in 1844. He was commissioned by the United States Mint in Philadelphia to make their balances, which he did so well that he was invited to make the bullion balances for the Department of Treasury. He later made scales for the Mexican Mint, Assay Office in New York, and the San Francisco Mint.

According to Ernest Child, Troemner was probably was the first American manufacturer to follow the French mathematician Gilles Personne de Roberval's balance design. This is distinguished by the load being superimposed on the beam, rather than suspended from the beam, and allowed faster weighings.

After his death in 1873 his wife Catherine inherited the business, which was kept in the family until incorporating in 1955.

Notes

References
 John Meeks Shannon and Geraldine Collins Shannon. The Henry Troemner Company. Robert A. Paselk Scientific Instrument Museum at Humboldt State University.

External links
 Troemner history at Troemner Inc. site

Businesspeople from Philadelphia
German emigrants to the United States
American scientific instrument makers
1809 births
1873 deaths
19th-century American businesspeople